Xanthomonas theicola is a species of bacteria.

External links
Type strain of Xanthomonas theicola at BacDive -  the Bacterial Diversity Metadatabase

Xanthomonadales
Bacteria described in 1995